Instant messaging (IM) technology is a type of online chat allowing real-time text transmission over the Internet or another computer network. Messages are typically transmitted between two or more parties, when each user inputs text and triggers a transmission to the recipient(s), who are all connected on a common network. It differs from email in that conversations over instant messaging happen in real-time (hence "instant"). Most modern IM applications (sometimes called "social messengers", "messaging apps" or "chat apps") use push technology and also add other features such as emojis (or graphical smileys), file transfer, chatbots, voice over IP, or video chat capabilities.

Instant messaging systems tend to facilitate connections between specified known users (often using a contact list also known as a "buddy list" or "friend list"), and can be standalone applications or integrated into e.g. a wider social media platform, or a website where it can for instance be used for conversational commerce. IM can also consist of conversations in "chat rooms". Depending on the IM protocol, the technical architecture can be peer-to-peer (direct point-to-point transmission) or client–server (an IM service center retransmits messages from the sender to the communication device). It is usually distinguished from text messaging which is typically simpler and normally uses cellular phone networks.

Instant messaging applications can store messages with either local-based device storage (e.g WhatsApp, Viber, Line, WeChat, Signal etc.) or cloud-based server storage (e.g Telegram, Skype, Facebook Messenger, Google Meet/Chat, Discord, Slack etc.).

Instant messaging was pioneered in the early Internet era; the IRC protocol was the earliest to achieve wide adoption. Later in the 1990s, ICQ was among the first closed and commercialized instant messengers, and several rival services appeared afterwards as it became a popular use of the Internet. Beginning with its first introduction in 2005, BlackBerry Messenger, which initially had been available only on BlackBerry smartphones, soon became one of the most popular mobile instant messaging apps worldwide. BBM was for instance the most used mobile messaging app in the United Kingdom and Indonesia. Instant messaging remains very popular today; IM apps are the most widely used smartphone apps: in 2018 there were over 50 million Signal users, 980 million monthly active users of WeChat and 1.3 billion monthly users of WhatsApp Messenger.

Overview 

Instant messaging is a set of communication technologies used for text-based communication between two (private messaging) or more (chat room) participants over the Internet or other types of networks (see also LAN messenger). IM–chat happens in real-time. Of importance is that online chat and instant messaging differ from other technologies such as email due to the perceived quasi-synchrony of the communications by the users. Some systems permit messages to be sent to users not then 'logged on' (offline messages), thus removing some differences between IM and email (often done by sending the message to the associated email account).

IM allows effective and efficient communication, allowing immediate receipt of acknowledgment or reply. However IM is basically not necessarily supported by transaction control. In many cases, instant messaging includes added features which can make it even more popular. For example, users may see each other via webcams, or talk directly for free over the Internet using a microphone and headphones or loudspeakers. Many applications allow file transfers, although they are usually limited in the permissible file-size. It is usually possible to save a text conversation for later reference. Instant messages are often logged in a local message history, making it similar to the persistent nature of emails.

Major IM services are controlled by their corresponding companies. They usually follow the client–server model when all clients have to first connect to the central server. This requires users to trust this server because messages can generally be accessed by the company. Companies can be compelled to reveal their user's communication. Companies can also suspend user accounts for any reason. 

Non-IM types of chat include multicast transmission, usually referred to as "chat rooms", where participants might be anonymous or might be previously known to each other (for example collaborators on a project that is using chat to facilitate communication). 

An instant message service center (IMSC) is a network element in the mobile telephone network which delivers instant messages. When a user sends an IM message to another user, the phone sends the message to the IMSC.  The IMSC stores the message and delivers it to the destination user when they are available. The IMSC usually has a configurable time limit for how long it will store the message. Few companies who make many of the IMSCs in use in the GSM world are Miyowa, Followap and OZ. Other players include Acision, Colibria, Ericsson, Nokia, Comverse Technology, Now Wireless, Jinny Software, Miyowa, Feelingk and few others.

The term "Instant Messenger" is a service mark of Time Warner and may not be used in software not affiliated with AOL in the United States. For this reason, in April 2007, the instant messaging client formerly named Gaim (or gaim) announced that they would be renamed "Pidgin".

Clients 

Each modern IM service generally provides its own client, either a separately installed piece of software, or a browser-based client. They are normally centralised networks run by the servers of the platform's operators, unlike peer-to-peer protocols like XMPP. These usually only work within the same IM network, although some allow limited function with other services. Third party client software applications exist that will connect with most of the major IM services. There is the class of instant messengers that uses the serverless model, which doesn't require servers, and the IM network consists only of clients. There are several serverless messengers: RetroShare, Tox, Bitmessage, Ricochet, Ring.

Some examples of popular IM services today include Signal, Telegram, WhatsApp Messenger, WeChat, QQ Messenger, Viber, Line, and Snapchat. The popularity of certain apps greatly differ between different countries. Certain apps have emphasis on certain uses - for example Skype focuses on video calling, Slack focuses on messaging and file sharing for work teams, and Snapchat focuses on image messages. Some social networking services offer messaging services as a component of their overall platform, such as Facebook's Facebook Messenger, who also own WhatsApp. While others have a direct messaging function as an additional adjunct component of their social networking platforms, like Instagram, Reddit, Tumblr, TikTok, Clubhouse and Twitter, either directly or through chat rooms.

Features

Private and group messaging
Private chat allows private conversation with another person or a group. The privacy aspect can also be enhanced in a number of ways such as end to end encryption by default like Signal. Or some applications have a timer feature, like Snapchat, where messages, conversations or files such as photos are automatically deleted from the users phone once the time limit is reached. Public and group chat features allow users to communicate with multiple people at a time.

Calling
Many major IM services and applications offer the call feature for user-to-user calls, conference calls, and voice messages. The call functionality is useful for professionals who utilize the application for work purposes and as a hands-free method. Videotelephony using a webcam is also possible by some.

Games and entertainment
Some IM applications include in-app games for entertainment. Yahoo! Messenger for example introduced these where users could play a game and viewed by friends in real-time. The Messenger application has a built in option to play computer games with people in a chat, including games like Tetris and Blackjack.

Payments
Though a relatively new feature, peer-to-peer payments are available on major messaging platforms. This functionality allows individuals to use one application for both communication and financial tasks. The lack of a service fee also makes messaging apps advantageous to financial applications. Major platforms such as Facebook messenger and WeChat already offer a payment feature, and this functionality is likely to become a standard amongst IM apps competing in the market.

History

Though the term dates from the 1990s, instant messaging predates the Internet, first appearing on multi-user operating systems like Compatible Time-Sharing System (CTSS) and Multiplexed Information and Computing Service (Multics) in the mid-1960s. Initially, some of these systems were used as notification systems for services like printing, but quickly were used to facilitate communication with other users logged into the same machine. CTSS facilitated communication via text message for up to 30 people. 

Parallel to instant messaging were early online chat facilities, the earliest of which was Talkomatic (1973) on the PLATO system, which allowed 5 people to chat simultaneously on a 512x512 plasma display (5 lines of text + 1 status line per person). During the bulletin board system (BBS) phenomenon that peaked during the 1980s, some systems incorporated chat features which were similar to instant messaging; Freelancin' Roundtable was one prime example. The first such general-availability commercial online chat service (as opposed to PLATO, which was educational) was the CompuServe CB Simulator in 1980, created by CompuServe executive Alexander "Sandy" Trevor in Columbus, Ohio.

As networks developed, the protocols spread with the networks. Some of these used a peer-to-peer protocol (e.g. talk, ntalk and ytalk), while others required peers to connect to a server (see talker and IRC). The Zephyr Notification Service (still in use at some institutions) was invented at MIT's Project Athena in the 1980s to allow service providers to locate and send messages to users.

Early instant messaging programs were primarily real-time text, where characters appeared as they were typed. This includes the Unix "talk" command line program, which was popular in the 1980s and early 1990s. Some BBS chat programs (i.e. Celerity BBS) also used a similar interface. Modern implementations of real-time text also exist in instant messengers, such as AOL's Real-Time IM as an optional feature.

In the latter half of the 1980s and into the early 1990s, the Quantum Link online service for Commodore 64 computers offered user-to-user messages between concurrently connected customers, which they called "On-Line Messages" (or OLM for short), and later "FlashMail." Quantum Link later became America Online and made AOL Instant Messenger (AIM, discussed later). While the Quantum Link client software ran on a Commodore 64, using only the Commodore's PETSCII text-graphics, the screen was visually divided into sections and OLMs would appear as a yellow bar saying "Message From:" and the name of the sender along with the message across the top of whatever the user was already doing, and presented a list of options for responding. As such, it could be considered a type of graphical user interface (GUI), albeit much more primitive than the later Unix, Windows and Macintosh based GUI IM software. OLMs were what Q-Link called "Plus Services" meaning they charged an extra per-minute fee on top of the monthly Q-Link access costs.

Modern, Internet-wide, GUI-based messaging clients as they are known today, began to take off in the mid-1990s with PowWow, ICQ, and AOL Instant Messenger. Similar functionality was offered by CU-SeeMe in 1992; though primarily an audio/video chat link, users could also send textual messages to each other. AOL later acquired Mirabilis, the authors of ICQ; establishing dominance in the instant messaging market. A few years later ICQ (then owned by AOL) was awarded two patents for instant messaging by the U.S. patent office. Meanwhile, other companies developed their own software; (Excite, MSN, Ubique, and Yahoo!), each with its own proprietary protocol and client; users therefore had to run multiple client applications if they wished to use more than one of these networks. In 1998, IBM released IBM Lotus Sametime, a product based on technology acquired when IBM bought Haifa-based Ubique and Lexington-based Databeam.

In 2000, an open-source application and open standards-based protocol called Jabber was launched. The protocol was standardized under the name Extensible Messaging and Presence Protocol (XMPP). XMPP servers could act as gateways to other IM protocols, reducing the need to run multiple clients. Multi-protocol clients can use any of the popular IM protocols by using additional local libraries for each protocol. IBM Lotus Sametime's November 2007 release added IBM Lotus Sametime Gateway support for XMPP.

Video calling using a webcam also started taking off during this time. Microsoft NetMeeting was one of the earliest, but Skype released in 2003 was one of the first that focused on this features and brought it to a wider audience.

By 2006, AIM controlled 52 percent of the instant messaging market, but rapidly declined shortly thereafter as the company struggled to compete with other services.

By 2010, instant messaging over the Web was in sharp decline in favor of messaging features on social networks. Social networking providers often offer IM abilities, for example Facebook Chat, while Twitter can be thought of as a Web 2.0 instant messaging system. Similar server-side chat features are part of most dating websites, such as OkCupid or PlentyofFish. The former most popular IM platforms were terminated in later years, such as AIM.

The popularity of instant messaging was soon revived with new services in the form of mobile applications, notable examples of the time being BlackBerry Messenger (first released in 2005; today available as BlackBerry Messenger Enterprise)  and  WhatsApp (first released in 2009). Unlike previous IM applications, these newer ones usually ran only on mobile devices and coincided with the rising popularity of Internet-enabled smartphones; this led to IM surpassing SMS in message volume by 2013. By 2014, IM had more users than social networks. In January 2015, the service WhatsApp alone accommodated 30 billion messages daily in comparison to about 20 billion for SMS.

In 2016, Google introduced a new intelligent messaging app that incorporated machine learning technology called Allo. Google Allo was shut down on March 12, 2019.

Interoperability 

Standard complementary instant messaging applications offer functions like file transfer, contact list(s), the ability to hold several simultaneous conversations, etc. These may be all the functions that a small business needs, but larger organizations will require more sophisticated applications that can work together. The solution to finding applications capable of this is to use enterprise versions of instant messaging applications. These include titles like XMPP, Lotus Sametime, Microsoft Office Communicator, etc., which are often integrated with other enterprise applications such as workflow systems. These enterprise applications, or enterprise application integration (EAI), are built to certain constraints, namely storing data in a common format.

There have been several attempts to create a unified standard for instant messaging: IETF's Session Initiation Protocol (SIP) and SIP for Instant Messaging and Presence Leveraging Extensions (SIMPLE), Application Exchange (APEX), Instant Messaging and Presence Protocol (IMPP), the open XML-based Extensible Messaging and Presence Protocol (XMPP), and Open Mobile Alliance's Instant Messaging and Presence Service developed specifically for mobile devices.

Most attempts at producing a unified standard for the major IM providers (AOL, Yahoo! and Microsoft) have failed, and each continues to use its own proprietary protocol.

However, while discussions at IETF were stalled, Reuters signed the first inter-service provider connectivity agreement in September 2003. This agreement enabled AIM, ICQ and MSN Messenger users to talk with Reuters Messaging counterparts and vice versa. Following this, Microsoft, Yahoo! and AOL agreed to a deal in which Microsoft's Live Communications Server 2005 users would also have the possibility to talk to public instant messaging users. This deal established SIP/SIMPLE as a standard for protocol interoperability and established a connectivity fee for accessing public instant messaging groups or services. Separately, on October 13, 2005, Microsoft and Yahoo! announced that by the 3rd quarter of 2006 they would interoperate using SIP/SIMPLE, which was followed, in December 2005, by the AOL and Google strategic partnership deal in which Google Talk users would be able to communicate with AIM and ICQ users provided they have an AIM account.

There are two ways to combine the many disparate protocols:
 Combine the many disparate protocols inside the IM client application.
 Combine the many disparate protocols inside the IM server application. This approach moves the task of communicating with the other services to the server. Clients need not know or care about other IM protocols. For example, LCS 2005 Public IM Connectivity. This approach is popular in XMPP servers; however, the so-called transport projects suffer the same reverse engineering difficulties as any other project involved with closed protocols or formats.

Some approaches allow organizations to deploy their own, private instant messaging network by enabling them to restrict access to the server (often with the IM network entirely behind their firewall) and administer user permissions. Other corporate messaging systems allow registered users to also connect from outside the corporation LAN, by using an encrypted, firewall-friendly, HTTPS-based protocol. Usually, a dedicated corporate IM server has several advantages, such as pre-populated contact lists, integrated authentication, and better security and privacy.

Certain networks have made changes to prevent them from being used by such multi-network IM clients. For example, Trillian had to release several revisions and patches to allow its users to access the MSN, AOL, and Yahoo! networks, after changes were made to these networks. The major IM providers usually cite the need for formal agreements, and security concerns as reasons for making these changes.

The use of proprietary protocols has meant that many instant messaging networks have been incompatible and users have been unable to reach users on other networks. This may have allowed social networking with IM-like features and text messaging an opportunity to gain market share at the expense of IM.

Effects of IM on communication 
Messaging applications have affected the way people communicate on their devices. A survey conducted by MetrixLabs showed that messaging applications 63% of Baby Boomers, 63% of Generation X, and 67% of Generation Y said that they used messaging applications in place of texting. A Facebook survey showed that 65% of people surveyed thought that messaging applications made group messaging easier.

Effects on workplace communication 
Messaging applications have also changed how people communicate in the workplace. Enterprise messaging applications like Slack, TeleMessage, Teamnote and Yammer allow companies to enforce policies on how employees message at work and ensure secure storage of sensitive data. Message applications allow employees to separate work information from their personal emails and texts.

Messaging applications may make workplace communication efficient, but they can also have consequences on productivity. A study at Slack showed on average, people spend 10 hours a day on Slack, which is about 67% more time than they spend using email.

IM language 

Users sometimes make use of internet slang or text speak to abbreviate common words or expressions to quicken conversations or reduce keystrokes. The language has become widespread, with well-known expressions such as 'lol' translated over to face-to-face language.

Emotions are often expressed in shorthand, such as the abbreviation LOL, BRB and TTYL; respectively laugh(ing) out loud, be right back, and talk to you later.

Some, however, attempt to be more accurate with emotional expression over IM. Real time reactions such as (chortle) (snort) (guffaw) or (eye-roll) are becoming more popular. Also there are certain standards that are being introduced into mainstream conversations including, '#' indicates the use of sarcasm in a statement and '*' which indicates a spelling mistake and/or grammatical error in the prior message, followed by a correction.

Business application 
Instant messaging has proven to be similar to personal computers, email, and the World Wide Web, in that its adoption for use as a business communications medium was driven primarily by individual employees using consumer software at work, rather than by formal mandate or provisioning by corporate information technology departments. Tens of millions of the consumer IM accounts in use are being used for business purposes by employees of companies and other organizations.

In response to the demand for business-grade IM and the need to ensure security and legal compliance, a new type of instant messaging, called "Enterprise Instant Messaging" ("EIM") was created when Lotus Software launched IBM Lotus Sametime in 1998. Microsoft followed suit shortly thereafter with Microsoft Exchange Instant Messaging, later created a new platform called Microsoft Office Live Communications Server, and released Office Communications Server 2007 in October 2007. Oracle Corporation also jumped into the market with its Oracle Beehive unified collaboration software. Both IBM Lotus and Microsoft have introduced federation between their EIM systems and some of the public IM networks so that employees may use one interface to both their internal EIM system and their contacts on AOL, MSN, and Yahoo. As of 2010, leading EIM platforms include IBM Lotus Sametime, Microsoft Office Communications Server, Jabber XCP and Cisco Unified Presence. Industry-focused EIM platforms such as Reuters Messaging and Bloomberg Messaging also provide IM abilities to financial services companies.

The adoption of IM across corporate networks outside of the control of IT organizations creates risks and liabilities for companies who do not effectively manage and support IM use. Companies implement specialized IM archiving and security products and services to mitigate these risks and provide safe, secure, productive instant messaging abilities to their employees. IM is increasingly becoming a feature of enterprise software rather than a stand-alone application.

IM products can usually be categorised into two types: Enterprise Instant Messaging (EIM) and Consumer Instant Messaging (CIM). Enterprise solutions use an internal IM server, however this is not always feasible, particularly for smaller businesses with limited budgets. The second option, using a CIM provides the advantage of being inexpensive to implement and has little need for investing in new hardware or server software.

For corporate use, encryption and conversation archiving are usually regarded as important features due to security concerns. There are also a bunch of open source encrypting messengers. Sometimes the use of different operating systems in organizations requires use of software that supports more than one platform. For example, many software companies use Windows in administration departments but have software developers who use Linux.

Comparison to SMS

SMS is the acronym for “short message service” and allows mobile phone users to send text messages without an Internet connection, while instant messaging provides similar services through an Internet connection. SMS was a much more dominant form of communication before smartphones became widely used globally. While SMS relied on traditional paid telephone services, instant messaging apps on mobiles were available for free or a minor data charge. In 2012 SMS volume peaked, and in 2013 chat apps surpassed SMS in global message volume.

Easier group messaging was another advantage of smartphone messaging apps and also contributed to their adoption. Before the introduction of messaging apps, smartphone users could only participate in single-person interactions via mobile voice calls or SMS. With the introduction of messaging apps, the group chat functionality allows all the members to see an entire thread of everyone's responses. Members can also respond directly to each other, rather than having to go through the member who started the group message, to relay the information.

However, SMS still remains popular in the United States because it is usually included free in monthly phone bundles. While SMS volumes in some countries like Denmark, Spain and Singapore dropped up to two-thirds from 2011 to 2013, in the United States SMS use only dropped by about one quarter.

Security and archiving 

Crackers (malicious or black hat hackers) have consistently used IM networks as vectors for delivering phishing attempts, drive-by URLs, and virus-laden file attachments from 2004 to the present, with over 1100 discrete attacks listed by the IM Security Center in 2004–2007. Hackers use two methods of delivering malicious code through IM: delivery of viruses, trojan horses, or spyware within an infected file, and the use of "socially engineered" text with a web address that entices the recipient to click on a URL connecting him or her to a website that then downloads malicious code.

Viruses, computer worms, and trojans usually propagate by sending themselves rapidly through the infected user's contact list. An effective attack using a poisoned URL may reach tens of thousands of users in a short period when each user's contact list receives messages appearing to be from a trusted friend. The recipients click on the web address, and the entire cycle starts again. Infections may range from nuisance to criminal, and are becoming more sophisticated each year.

IM connections sometimes occur in plain text, making them vulnerable to eavesdropping. Also, IM client software often requires the user to expose open UDP ports to the world, raising the threat posed by potential security vulnerabilities.

In the early 2000s, a new class of IT security provider emerged to provide remedies for the risks and liabilities faced by corporations who chose to use IM for business communications. The IM security providers created new products to be installed in corporate networks for the purpose of archiving, content-scanning, and security-scanning IM traffic moving in and out of the corporation. Similar to the e-mail filtering vendors, the IM security providers focus on the risks and liabilities described above.

With rapid adoption of IM in the workplace, demand for IM security products began to grow in the mid-2000s. By 2007, the preferred platform for the purchase of security software had become the "computer appliance", according to IDC, who estimated that by 2008, 80% of network security products would be delivered via an appliance.

By 2014 however, the level of safety offered by instant messengers was still extremely poor. According to a scorecard made by the Electronic Frontier Foundation, only 7 out of 39 instant messengers received a perfect score, whereas the most popular instant messengers at the time only attained a score of 2 out of 7. A number of studies have shown that IM services are quite vulnerable for providing user privacy.

Encryption 
Encryption is the primary method that messaging apps use to protect user's data privacy and security. SMS messages are not encrypted, making them insecure, as the content of each SMS message is visible to mobile carriers and governments and can be intercepted by a third party. SMS messages also leak metadata, or information about the message that is not the message content itself, such as phone numbers of the sender and recipient, which can identify the people involved in the conversation. SMS messages can also be spoofed and the sender of the message can be edited to impersonate another person.

Messaging applications on the market that use end-to-end encryption include Signal, WhatsApp, Wire and iMessage. Applications that have been criticized for lacking or poor encryption methods include Telegram and Confide, as both are prone to error or not having encryption enabled by default.

Compliance risks 
In addition to the malicious code threat, the use of instant messaging at work also creates a risk of non-compliance to laws and regulations governing use of electronic communications in businesses.

In the United States alone there are over 10,000 laws and regulations related to electronic messaging and records retention. The better-known of these include the Sarbanes–Oxley Act, HIPAA, and SEC 17a-3.

Clarification from the Financial Industry Regulatory Authority (FINRA) was issued to member firms in the financial services industry in December, 2007, noting that "electronic communications", "email", and "electronic correspondence" may be used interchangeably and can include such forms of electronic messaging as instant messaging and text messaging. Changes to Federal Rules of Civil Procedure, effective December 1, 2006, created a new category for electronic records which may be requested during discovery in legal proceedings.

Most nations also regulate use of electronic messaging and electronic records retention in similar fashion as the United States. The most common regulations related to IM at work involve the need to produce archived business communications to satisfy government or judicial requests under law. Many instant messaging communications fall into the category of business communications that must be archived and retrievable.

User base 

As of March 2022, the most used messaging apps worldwide include: Signal with 100 million, Line with 217 million, Viber with 260 million, Telegram with 700 million, WeChat with 1.2 billion, Facebook Messenger with 1.3 billion, and WhatsApp with 2.0 billion users. There are 25 countries in the world where WhatsApp messenger is not the market leader in messaging apps, such as the United States, Canada, Australia, New Zealand, Denmark, Norway, Sweden, Hungary, Lithuania, Poland, Slovakia, Philippines, and China.  

Messaging apps have varying levels of adoption in different countries. As of April 2022: 
WhatsApp by Meta Platforms is the most popular messaging app in several countries in South America, Western Europe, Africa, Middle East, South Asia, and Southeast Asia. 
Facebook Messenger by Meta Platforms is the most popular messaging app in North America, Northern Europe, some Central Europe countries, and Oceania. 
Telegram is the most popular messaging app in several Eastern Europe countries, and the second preferred option after WhatsApp in several countries in Western Europe, Middle East, South Asia, Southeast Asia, Africa, Central and South America. 
Viber by Rakuten has a strong presence in Central and Eastern Europe (Bulgaria, Greece, Serbia, Ukraine, Russia). It is also moderately successful in Philippines and Vietnam.  
Line by Naver Corporation is used widely in some countries in Asia (Japan, Taiwan, Thailand). 
Messaging apps that are predominately used in only one country include: KakaoTalk in South Korea, Zalo in Vietnam, WeChat in China, and imo in Qatar. 
While not the dominant app for one-to-one messaging in any country, Discord is commonly used among online communities due to its ability to support chats with a large amount of members, topic-based channels, and cloud-based storage.

More than 100 million users

Other platforms

Closed services and such with unclear activity

See also 
Terms
 Ambient awareness
 Communication protocol
 Mass collaboration
 Message-oriented middleware
 Operator messaging
 Social media
 Text messaging
SMS
 Unified communications / Messaging

Lists
 Comparison of cross-platform instant messaging clients
 Comparison of instant messaging protocols
 Comparison of user features of messaging platforms

Other
 Code Shikara

References

External links 
 

 
Internet culture
Internet Relay Chat
Social media
Online chat
Videotelephony
Text messaging